Donald Liao Poon-huai, CBE, JP (born 29 October 1929) is a Taiwanese-born Hong Kong government official and landscape architect. He took an instrumental role in the expansion of the public housing in Hong Kong in the 1960s and 70s, designing new types of public estates and was Secretary for Housing and chairman of the Hong Kong Housing Authority from 1980 to 1985. He became the Secretary for District Administration from 1985 to 1989.

Early life and education
Liao was born in Yunlin County (part of Tainan Prefecture under Japanese rule), Taiwan on 29 October 1929. He moved to Hong Kong to learn English after finishing his basic education in Taiwan. He attended the St. Joseph's College, Hong Kong and subsequently the University of Hong Kong. He later furthered his study at the King's College of the Durham University after winning a British Council scholarship, where he graduated with a degree in landscape design.

Government career
Liao became the first member of the Hong Kong Institute of Landscape Architects. In 1960, he started working for Hong Kong government's Housing Division, designing and managing some of Hong Kong's biggest social housing projects during the 1960s and 70s at the time of the Ten-Year Housing Programme carried out by Governor Murray MacLehose. He took a leading role in revolutionising social housing in order the address the overcrowding housing condition. He applied his own design in Wah Fu Estate, the "Twin Tower Block": like Scottish "Z-plan" castles, these each comprised two juxtaposed towers of a hollow, internally galleried plan. The second design innovation was an adaptation of the comprehensive land-use planning of the English New Towns.

He later joined the Hong Kong government to become the Commissioner of Housing in 1968 and a member of the Town Planning Board. He proposed the Home Ownership Scheme, which allowed those who lived in rented public housing to buy their own flats. He became Secretary for Housing and chairman of the Hong Kong Housing Authority from 1980 to 1985. He kept on serving in several senior government posts including the Secretary for District Administration from 1985 until his eventual retirement in 1989. During his government service, he was also an official member of the Hong Kong Legislative Council in 1980 and of the Hong Kong Executive Council in 1985. He was also a member of the Sino-British Joint Liaison Group. He served on the Council of the Hong Kong Stock Exchange from 1991 to 1995. In 1992, he was appointed Hong Kong Affairs Advisor by the Beijing government.

Honours and personal life
For his public service, he was awarded Officer of the Order of the British Empire (OBE) and Commander of the Order of the British Empire (CBE). In 2011, he was made Honorary Doctor of Science at the Durham University. He married ballet dancer Christine Yuen Ching Me and has three children. He is also a member of the Hong Kong Jockey Club.

See also
 Public housing in Hong Kong

References

1929 births
Living people
Members of the Executive Council of Hong Kong
Members of the Legislative Council of Hong Kong
Alumni of the University of Hong Kong
Hong Kong architects
Hong Kong Affairs Advisors
Government officials of Hong Kong
Hong Kong people of Taiwanese descent
Commanders of the Order of the British Empire
Alumni of King's College, Newcastle